The Grand Spanish Temple also Cahal Grande synagogue, also Marele templu sefard Cahal Grande/Templul Mare Spaniol was located on 12 Negru Vodă Street, in Văcărești, Bucharest, Romania.  The building is believed to have been  "one of the most beautiful Jewish buildings in Bucharest".

History
The synagogue was built in 1818. The building was devastated by the far-right Legionaries in 1941. The synagogue was rebuilt after the war. However, in 1985 the building was demolished to make room for the Union Boulevard in Bucharest.

See also
 History of the Jews in Romania.
 List of synagogues in Romania.
 Legionnaires' rebellion and Bucharest pogrom

References

External links 
 Inside Romania’s 1941 failed coup, with the world’s first female war correspondent By Patrick GarrettAugust 4, 2016
 Jews in Romania
 Between Wanderings: Jewish Life and Culture, 1850s-1920s. Bucharest’s lost Sephardic world: A letter and photos (1904), Excerpts from a Letter to Senator Ángel Pulido, Madrid Bucharest, February 16, 1904. [Translation from Spanish]

Synagogues in Bucharest
Synagogues completed in 1818
Sephardi synagogues
Sephardi Jewish culture in Romania
Destroyed synagogues
Demolished buildings and structures in Bucharest
Buildings and structures demolished in 1985